Sicunusa is a town in southwest Eswatini. It is located close to the border with South Africa.

References
Fitzpatrick, M., Blond, B., Pitcher, G., Richmond, S., and Warren, M. (2004)  South Africa, Lesotho and Swaziland. Footscray, VIC: Lonely Planet.

Populated places in Eswatini
Eswatini–South Africa border crossings